UT Health San Antonio Cancer Center, founded in 1974, is an NCI-designated Cancer Center in San Antonio, Texas. It is a component of the University of Texas Health Science Center, San Antonio which is located adjacently.

The center serves more than 4.4 million people in the high-growth corridor of Central and South Texas including Austin, San Antonio, Laredo and the Rio Grande Valley, and handles more than 120,000 patient visits each year, and has a faculty staff of 140.

References

External links
Official website of CTRC

Medical research institutes in the United States
University of Texas Health Science Center at San Antonio
Education in Laredo, Texas
Research institutes in Texas